Peter Hayman may refer to:

 Peter Hayman (ornithologist) (born 1930), British ornithologist and illustrator
 Peter Hayman (diplomat) (1914–1992), British diplomat and intelligence operative

See also 
 Peter Heyman (disambiguation)